The 2017 Atlantic Coast Conference men's soccer tournament was the 31st edition of the ACC Men's Soccer Tournament. The tournament decided the Atlantic Coast Conference champion and guaranteed representative into the 2017 NCAA Division I Men's Soccer Championship. The final was played at MUSC Health Stadium in Charleston, SC

Qualification 

All twelve teams in the Atlantic Coast Conference earned a berth into the ACC Tournament. The top 4 seeds receive first round byes and will host the winner of a first round game.  All rounds, with the exception of the final are held at the higher seed's home field.  Seeding is determined by regular season conference record.  Ties are broken by overall winning percentage.

Bracket 
*Note: Home team listed first.  Rankings shown are ACC Tournament Seeds.

Schedule

First round

Quarterfinals

Semifinals

Finals

Statistics

Goalscorers
3 goals
  Jon Bakero – Wake Forest
  Jon Gallagher – Notre Dame

2 goals
  Pablo Aguilar – Virginia
  Saul Chinchilla – Clemson
  Jeff Farina – Notre Dame
  Blake Townes – Notre Dame

1 goal

  Robin Afamefuna – Virginia
  Patrick Bunk-Andersen – Clemson
  Joe Bell – Virginia
  Diego Campos – Clemson
  Félicien Dumas – Notre Dame
  Omir Fernandez – Wake Forest
  Edward Opoku – Virginia
  Gaetan Roux – Virginia Tech
  Ema Twumasi – Wake Forest
  Alan Winn – North Carolina

Own Goals
 Boston College (team) against Virginia

All-Tournament team

See also 
 Atlantic Coast Conference
 2017 Atlantic Coast Conference men's soccer season
 2017 NCAA Division I men's soccer season
 2017 NCAA Division I Men's Soccer Championship
 2017 ACC Women's Soccer Tournament

References 

ACC Men's Soccer Tournament
Tournament
ACC Men's Soccer Tournament